Fabian Benedikt Meinrad Gramling (born 5 April 1987) is a German politician of the Christian Democratic Union who has been serving as a Member of the German Bundestag since 2021.

Political career
From 2016 to 2021, Gramling served as a member of the State Parliament of Baden-Württemberg. During that time, he was his parliamentary group’s spokesperson on labour policy.

Gramling was elected to the Bundestag in 2021, representing the Neckar-Zaber district. In parliament, he has since been serving on the Committee on Climate Action and Energy.

References

Living people
1987 births
Christian Democratic Union of Germany politicians
Members of the Bundestag 2021–2025
21st-century German politicians